Undibacterium danionis is a Gram-negative and rod-shaped bacterium from the genus of Undibacterium which has been isolated from the fish Danio rerio.

References

Burkholderiales
Bacteria described in 2016